San of Wa (讃) was a king of Wa in the first half of the 5th century (middle of the Kofun era). 。

He was the brother of Chin, the first of the "Five kings of Wa" (although San is not seen as a king in the historical record.
）。Some have compared him to either the 15th Emperor Ojin, the 16th Emperor Nintoku, or the 17th Emperor Richu.

Records

Book of Song 

 Song Book, Chronicles
In the Book of Song, the Emperor Wu of Song issued an imperial decree in the 2nd year of Yongchou (421), ordering the Liu Song dynasty to grant Wu of Song a title for his tribute from Wanli.。
 In the 2nd year of Yuanjia (425), San also sent Cao Da, a librarian, to the Song Dynasty to present a written appeal to Wen, and presented him with local specialties. Later, after San's death, his younger brother Jin stood as king.。
 The Book of Song (Song shu), Book of the Chronicles (Song shu), Book of the Chronicles (Song shu)
 The Wen Di Ji, Yuan Jia 7 (430 years), Sho Tsuki article states that the king of Japan sent an envoy to present a fang material (a san or jin envoy?).

Book of Liang 

In the Book of Liang, the article on Japan states that there was a "tribute" to the king of Japan when Emperor An of Jin of the Jin (Eastern Jin), and that when An died, his younger brother Ya stood up.
。

History of the Southern Dynasties 
In the article of History of the Southern Dynasties, the Japanese envoys and tributes during the reign of Emperor An of the Jin Dynasty and the contents of the Song Book of Biography are described.

Others 
According to the article in the Book of Jin, in the 9th year of the reign of Emperor An (413), Goguryeo and Japan sent an envoy to offer a variety of goods (one theory is that it was an envoy from the Emperor Hsin). In the "Taiping Yulan," an anecdote in the "Ukihee Kiyoi Note" states that the tribute included "a ginseng and other items offered by the Japanese government.。

See also 

 Five kings of Wa

References

Bibliography 

 事典類
 
 
 
 坂元義種 「倭の五王」、「讃」。
 
 
  - リンクは朝日新聞社「コトバンク」。
 その他文献

External links 

 漢籍電子文献資料庫 - 台湾中央研究院

Five kings of Wa
Pages with unreviewed translations